James Breen may refer to:
James Breen (politician) (born 1945), Irish independent politician
James Breen (astronomer) (1826–1866), Irish astronomer
Jim Breen (born 1947), Australian professor in IT and telecommunications